Auguste Carli (12 July 1868 – 28 January 1930) was a French sculptor.

Biography

Early life
Auguste Carli was born on 12 July 1868 in Marseille, Bouches-du-Rhône, France. His younger brother, François Carli (1872-1957), was also a sculptor.

Career
He was a sculptor.

He designed two statues on either side of the main staircase of the Gare de Marseille-Saint-Charles: one, called 'Marseille colonie grecque' ("Marseille, Greek colony") and the other one, called 'Marseille Porte de l'Orient' ("Marseille, door to the East"). Additionally, he designed a sculpture on the building of the Caisse d'Épargne on the corner of Cours Pierre Puget and Place Estrangin in Marseille. He also designed a fountain with a sculpture of Amphitrite on the Place Joseph Etienne for Joseph Hippolyte Etienne (1790-1881), which was dedicated in 1906.

He designed a statue of Jesus Christ and Saint Veronica, which is displayed inside the Marseille Cathedral.

He also designed the tomb of Adolphe Joseph Thomas Monticelli (1824-1886) in the Palais Longchamp Marseille. Additionally, he designed sculptures in the Cimetière Saint-Pierre, a cemetery in Marseille.

Death
He died on 28 January 1930 in Paris.

Legacy
The Place Auguste et François Carli, a town square in Marseille, is named for him and his brother.

See also

List of works by Auguste Carli

Gallery

References

1868 births
1930 deaths
Sculptors from Marseille
20th-century French sculptors
19th-century French sculptors
French male sculptors
19th-century French male artists